Scheyer is a surname. Notable people with the surname include:
 Christine Scheyer (born 1994), Austrian alpine ski racer
 Galka Scheyer (1889–1945), German-American art collector and painter
 Jon Scheyer (born 1987), American-Israeli basketball player and coach